Gonzalo de Angulo, O.M. (1577 – 17 May 1633) was a Roman Catholic prelate who served as Bishop of Coro (1617–1633).

Biography
Gonzalo de Angulo was born in Valladolid, Spain in 1577 and ordained a priest in the Order of the Minims.
On 20 November 1617, he was appointed during the papacy of Pope Paul V as Bishop of Coro.
In 1618, he was consecrated bishop by Juan Bartolomé de Bohorquez e Hinojosa, Bishop of Antequera. 
He served as Bishop of Coro until his death on 17 May 1633.

While bishop, he was the principal consecrator of Pedro de Oviedo Falconi, Archbishop of Santo Domingo (1621).

See also 
Catholic Church in Venezuela

References

External links and additional sources
 (for Chronology of Bishops) 
 (for Chronology of Bishops) 

17th-century Roman Catholic bishops in Venezuela
Bishops appointed by Pope Paul V
1577 births
1633 deaths
Roman Catholic bishops of Coro